Thomas Trembath (16 January 1912 – 2 April 1978) was an Australian cricketer. He played three first-class cricket matches for Victoria between 1933 and 1934.

See also
 List of Victoria first-class cricketers

References

External links
 

1912 births
1978 deaths
Australian cricketers
Victoria cricketers
Cricketers from South Australia